John Bloxam may refer to:

 John Francis Bloxam (1807–1891), English academic and clergyman
 John Rouse Bloxam (1873–1928), English author and churchman